The Hilversum Trophy, also known as the Hewlett-Packard Trophy, was a women's tennis tournament played in Hilversum, Netherlands, in 1985 and 1986. The first event was held from 4 November 1985 – 11 November 1985; and the second from 29 September 1986 – 5 October 1986.

The tournament was played on indoor carpet and winners garnered a prize fund of $75,000.

Champions

Singles

Doubles

See also
 Dutch Open

References
ITF search

WTA Tour
Carpet court tennis tournaments
Indoor tennis tournaments
Tennis tournaments in the Netherlands
1985 establishments in the Netherlands
Recurring sporting events established in 1985
Recurring events disestablished in 1986
Defunct tennis tournaments in Europe
Defunct sports competitions in the Netherlands
Sports competitions in Hilversum